Manuel Aizpuru was a Spanish racing cyclist. He rode in the 1957 Tour de France.

References

External links
 

Year of birth missing
Possibly living people
Spanish male cyclists
Place of birth missing (living people)
People from Azkoitia
Sportspeople from Gipuzkoa
Cyclists from the Basque Country (autonomous community)